John Manson (born March 17, 1926) was a Canadian ice hockey player with the Edmonton Mercurys. He won a gold medal at the 1950 World Ice Hockey Championships in London, England. The 1950 Edmonton Mercurys team was inducted to the Alberta Sports Hall of Fame in 2011. He also played with the Lethbridge Maple Leafs and Edmonton Flyers. Manson later worked as a bricklayer and as a sales manager for a paper products company. In 2003, he was residing near Pigeon Lake, Alberta and was writing a book on the history of the area.

References

1926 births
Living people
Canadian ice hockey goaltenders
Ice hockey people from Edmonton